The Undisputed WWE Universal Championship exists when one wrestler holds both of the following titles simultaneously:
 WWE Championship, the men's world championship of WWE's Raw brand
 WWE Universal Championship, the men's world championship of WWE's SmackDown brand

In the American professional wrestling promotion WWE, the term refers to the wrestler who holds and defends both championships together, although both titles retain their individual lineages.

As of March 2023, Roman Reigns is the only wrestler who has achieved the feat after winning the Universal Championship at Payback in August 2020 and the WWE Championship at WrestleMania 38 in April 2022.

This is not to be confused with the Undisputed WWE Championship, which existed from 2001 to 2002. The Undisputed WWE Championship (originally WWF before the company was renamed) was the result of the unification of the WWE Championship and the WCW Championship into one championship, which carried the lineage of WWE's title while WCW's was retired.

See also
 Undisputed WWE Tag Team Championship

World heavyweight wrestling championships
WWE championships